Chad Cohn (born August 12, 1983) is an American Paralympic wheelchair rugby player from Tucson, Arizona. In 2011 and 2012 he was a National champion and won a gold medal at both the 2009 American Zonals and the 2011 IWRF World Championships. He also won a bronze medal at the 2012 Summer Paralympics and is a student at Pima Community College.

References

1983 births
Living people
Paralympic silver medalists for Great Britain
Paralympic bronze medalists for the United States
Paralympic medalists in wheelchair rugby
Paralympic wheelchair rugby players of the United States
American wheelchair rugby players
Sportspeople from Tucson, Arizona
Medalists at the 2012 Summer Paralympics
Medalists at the 2020 Summer Paralympics
Wheelchair rugby players at the 2012 Summer Paralympics
Wheelchair rugby players at the 2020 Summer Paralympics
Pima Community College alumni